The men's 50 kilometre cross-country skiing competition at the 1968 Winter Olympics in Grenoble, France, was held on Saturday 17 February at Autrans. Gjermund Eggen of Norway was the defending World champion while Sixten Jernberg of Sweden was the defending Olympic champion.

Each skier started at half a minute intervals, skiing the entire 50 kilometre course. Of the 51 athletes who started the race, 4 did not finish. 

Ole Ellefsæter of Norway took his second gold medal of the Games after being a part of Norway's winning team in the 4×10 kilometre relay earlier in the games.

Results
Sources:

References

External links
 Final results (International Ski Federation)

Men's cross-country skiing at the 1968 Winter Olympics
Men's 50 kilometre cross-country skiing at the Winter Olympics